The Leapmotor S01 (Chinese: 零跑S01), previously known as the Leapmotor LP-S01, is an all-electric car manufactured and sold in China by Leapmotor.

History

A prototype of the S01 was shown at the Guangzhou Auto Show 2017. At that time, the company had raised 380 million in capital, and construction of the factory had started. The S01 is the brand's first vehicle.

First deliveries occurred in June 2019.

Overview
The car is a coupe with 2+2 seating. The motor is a permanent magnet synchronous motor.

The vehicle combines small height and small width (hence the small frontal area) with an aerodynamic side profile and a relatively low mass for an EV (the manufacturer does not specify it on its website, but one previous announcement indicated a mass of only 1240 kg).

The car features level 2 autonomous driving (called "Leap Pilot"), with a possibility of enabling level 3 autonomous driving in the future through over-the-air updates.

As of March 2020, two battery options - 35.6 kWh and 48 kWh - are available. Typically for Chinese cars, the range is given only according to the overly optimistic NEDC methodology, no longer in use in Europe.

Pricing
Prices as of March 2020, after subsidies:

References

Cars introduced in 2019
Production electric cars
S01